Igala is a Yoruboid language, spoken by the Igala ethnic group of Nigeria. In 1989 an estimated 800,000 spoke Igala, primarily in Kogi State, though current estimates place the number of Igala speakers at upwards of 2 million. her dialects include Ibaji, Idah, Dekina, Ogugu, Ankpa and Ebu; it is believed that these languages share some similarities with the Yoruba and Itsekiri tribe.

Igala, also spelled Igara, living on the left bank of the Niger River below its junction with the Benue River. Their language belongs to the Benue-Congo branch of the Niger-Congo family. Their ruler, the Attah, traditionally also governed two other groups, the Bassa Nge and the Bass Nkome, who live between the Igala and the Benue River.

Food

Most of the indigenous foods eaten by the Igala people are made from millet, corn, plantain and bitter leaf. Ogidibo is a famous dish in Igala, made from corn; this is said to be a variant of the very known moi-moi. Ijobu and Omaidi are other excellent dishes made from corn and millet respectively.

Dressing

The Igala people hold colours in high esteem. The colours that appear the most in their attires are black and yellow with some stripes of white, blue or green. They believe that yellow symbolizes homeliness and black symbolizes prosperity and riches.

During traditional marriages, these colours are used on the headgear, scarf and caps of the bride and groom.

Igala Alphabet
The Igala alphabet has a total of thirty-one (31) letters, composed as follows:

a             b             ch              d              e               ẹ

f              g             gb              gw            h               i

j              k              kp             kw             l              m

n            ny            ñm            ñw             o              ọ

p             ñ               r                t               u              w

Igala Vowel
The Ígálá language has seven vowels: “a,” “e,” “ẹ,” “i,” “o,” “ọ,” “u”. The tones that represent this “rise, fall or neutral” movement of the voice are differently represented by tone marks (or accent marks) discussed below. Five tones have been identified as characterizing the Igala speech, namely:
 The High Tone, represented with an acute accent mark: a short stroke tilting upwards to the right (´).
 The Mid Tone, indicated by a blank space on top of a vowel in a word.
 The Mid-High Tone, which is an infrequent tone, occurs between the High and the Mid tone and is recognized through a macron (¯), a horizontal stroke.
 The Low tone, as its name indicates, is a low or grave, subdued tone and is recognized by a grave accent mark: a short stroke tilting downwards to the left (`).
 The fifth tone, which is usually found in negative statements, is called the Extra-High Tone and is indicated by a dot on letter ‘ṅ.’

Igala Homographs 
1. The word spelt, agba, depending on the tones used to pronounce it, may have four different meanings, namely:
 (i)      agba  (casual greeting); pronounced with static, sustained Mid or Neutral tone   – /  ̩a   ̩gba/                                           
 (ii)     àgbá  (hand-cuffs); pronounced with Low-High tone combination /   ̩à  ‘gbá / 
 (iii)    àgbà (chin); pronounced with Low tone replicated – /  ̩à   ̩gbà /
 (iv)     ágbá (Balsam tree); pronounced with the High tone duplicated – / á gbá / – 
2.   The bi-syllabic noun spelt, iga can generate three other words pronounced differently each having its distinct meaning as follows:

  (i)    ìga (Weaver bird); pronounced with Low-Mid tones – /  ̩ ì ‘ga / – and a                                           secondary-primary stress pattern.
  (ii)  ìgà  (net); pronounced with the Low tone duplicated – / ̩ ì   ̩ gà / –  and a    
 secondary-secondary stress pattern.
  (iii)  ìgá (estate);  pronounced with the Low-High tone combination – / ̩ ì  ‘gá / –  and                          a secondary-primary stress pattern.

References

External links

Roger Blench, Paul Gross. 2005. Igala mammal names.

Yoruboid languages

Languages of Nigeria